La fièvre monte à El Pao ("Fever Mounts at El Pao", also known in English as Republic of Sin)  is a 1959 film by director Luis Buñuel. Gérard Philipe died four months after the filming. This was his last film.

Plot
On the remote Caribbean island Ojeda an agitated population kills their despotic ruler Mariano Vargas. His secretary Ramón Vázquez takes over and tries to reinstate public order. Meanwhile, Alejandro Gual, leader of a special military unit, tries to take the place of Ramón Vázquez. Knowing that Ramón Vázquez had an affair with the dictator's wife Inés, he tries to turn the widow against her lover.

Cast
 Gérard Philipe as Ramón Vázquez
 María Félix as Inés Rojas
 Jean Servais as Alejandro Gual
 Miguel Ángel Ferriz as Gouvernor Mariano Vargas
 Raúl Dantés as Lieutenant García
 Domingo Soler as Professeur Juan Cárdenas
 Víctor Junco as Indarte

References

External links

1959 films
Films directed by Luis Buñuel
1950s French-language films
1959 drama films
Films set in the Caribbean
Films produced by Raymond Borderie
French drama films
1950s French films